Doncaster iPort or Doncaster Inland Port is an intermodal rail terminal; a Strategic Rail Freight Interchange, under construction in Rossington, Doncaster at junction 3 of the M18 motorway in England. It is to be connected to the rail network via the line of the former South Yorkshire Joint Railway, and from an extension of the former Rossington Colliery branch from the East Coast Main Line.

History
In 2006 developer HelioSlough began a public consultation around their proposals to create a rail freight depot west of Rossington.

In 2007 the Rossington Eco Town Partnership, an association of Rossington Forward, Rossington Development Trust, and local landowners and property developers UK Coal, Persimmon Homes, Helios Properties and Rossington Hall Ltd. presented plans to build a large  'eco town' development over a 20-year timespan of ten to fifteen thousand homes on land to the south and west of Rossington. The plan included redevelopment of the Rossington Colliery site, and included as part of the employment proposals the plan from Helios Properties for an Inland port. The development, which would have used significant amounts of agricultural land was opposed by a large majority of local residents. The project was shortlisted as one of 15 potential sites in the UK for a new town development in 2008, by 2009 the scope of the plan had been reduced to a five thousand home 'eco-village'.

The application, which included development on green belt land was approved by Doncaster Council but opposed by the Campaign to Protect Rural England, and four parish councils. In January 2010 local MPs Caroline Flint (Don Valley) and Jeffrey Ennis (Barnsley East and Mexborough) voiced their support for the plan. In March 2010 the UK government decided that no public enquiry would be needed for the project.

In June 2011 developers Helios Europe, Shepherd Aligned and SEGRO entered into a joint agreement to develop the site, which would be road connected via the £18 million Finningley and Rossington Regeneration Route Scheme (FARRRS) road scheme, and be built for international trade, with customs clearance. In September 2011 planning consent was given for the rail port; construction of the facility was initially planned to begin in 2012.

The tendering process for a rail operator of the port was begun in 2012: DB Schenker Rail UK, ABP, Stobart Group and Freightliner were listed as potential operators.  Hutchinson Whampoa had also been reported as a potential rail operator in 2011.

In 2013 the successor company to Helios Europe, Verdion obtained financial backing for its projects through Healthcare of Ontario Pension Plan (HOOPP). HOOPP planned to invest €1 billion in European logistics facilities through Verdion including the £400 million "iPort Doncaster" development. Work on the FARRRS connecting road began in late 2013.

Site development plan
The railport lies directly adjacent to and south, west, and east of the M18 motorway, Rossington Colliery and spoil heaps, and former South Yorkshire Joint Railway respectively. Historically the land was entirely agricultural, known as Little Moor, and part of Potteric Carr; Potteric Carr farm was located in the northwestern portion of the site. The land is low lying, about 5m above sea level, and was drained by man made cuts. Potteric Carr Nature Reserve is to the north of the site.

The rail terminal is planned to connect to the rail network via both the single track freight only (since 1929) former South Yorkshire Joint Railway (SYJR) (northward and southward connections), and from an extension of the former Rossington Colliery branch off the East Coast Main Line. The terminal is to be built to handle containerised (ISO Container, Swap body), and wagon-load trains, with a capacity of 20 trains per day.

The connection from the SYJR would be the primary route to the facility, which would have 4 reception sidings and 5 handling sidings, as well as all distribution warehouses rail connected, with addition lines for damaged wagons, and locomotive storage. Gauging enhancements to loading gauge W10 are planned for connecting lines, with construction design allowing overhead electrification at a later date.

In addition to the rail terminal, track work, and road access further civil engineering works was required as part of the plan, mainly environmental mitigation, including diversion of St. Catherine's Well Stream, landscaping, flood mitigation and drainage, footpaths, cyclepaths and bridleways. Developer estimates of job creation were over 4,000 jobs net created on site as a direct result when fully operational.

Construction and development

Verdion began the construction of a c.  and a  warehousing unit in May 2015; erection of the warehousing's frames began in November 2015.

In April 2016 Fellowes acquired a  warehouse space, also to function as the company's new UK headquarters.

After some testing in late 2017, the site officially opened to railway traffic in February 2018, however, regular freight trains did not start until 12 September 2018 when Princess Anne officially unveiled the new terminal. A week later, container trains from Southampton were arriving at the site at a rate of one per day site. From April 2019, the iPort is also served by two trains daily from Teesport. The terminal is also now served by two trains daily to and from the Port of Felixstowe. All of these trains are operated by GB Railfreight.

Notes

References

Sources

alt link, via Doncaster Metropolitan Borough Council

Further information

External links
Official

Defunct official

Railway freight terminals in the United Kingdom
Rail transport in Doncaster